Stadion Pasienky is a multi-purpose stadium in Bratislava, Slovakia. The stadium holds 11,591 people. It is used mostly for football matches and is the home ground of Slovan Bratislava from 2009 to 2018. The intensity of the floodlighting is 1,400 lux.

History
Pasienky Stadium (Slovak for "Pasture Stadium") was built in 1962 as a multi-purpose stadium. It was the home ground of FK Inter Bratislava for most of its history, until 2009. It was also used for Athletics Grand Prix of Slovakia (IAAF). Its current seating capacity is 11,500 people.

International tournaments 
The stadium hosted four matches of the 2000 UEFA European Under-21 Championship.

Group B

Third place play-off

International matches
Štadión Pasienky has hosted 5 competitive and 4 friendly matches of the Slovakia national football team.

Concerts
Depeche Mode performed at the stadium four times: the first one was on June 11, 2006 during their Touring the Angel. The second one was on June 22, 2009 during their Tour of the Universe, in front of a crowd of 31,500 people. The third one was on May 25, 2013 during their Delta Machine Tour, in front of a sold out crowd of 29,112 people. The 2006 and 2009 shows were recorded for the group's live albums projects Recording the Angel and Recording the Universe, respectively.

List of concerts

Transport
Stadium Pasienky is located in the third district of Bratislava, Slovakia. The Stadium can be approached by Tram, Trolleybus and Bus.

External links
Stadium Database Article
Football stadiums profile

References

Pasienky
Pasienky
Football venues in Czechoslovakia
Athletics (track and field) venues in Czechoslovakia
Pasienky
Buildings and structures in Bratislava
Multi-purpose stadiums in Slovakia
FK Inter Bratislava
Sports venues completed in 1962